Monroe North is a census-designated place (CDP) in Snohomish County, Washington, United States. The population was 1,666 at the 2010 census.

Geography
Monroe North is located at  (47.882534, -121.987952).

According to the United States Census Bureau, the CDP has a total area of 2.44 square miles (6.3 km²), all of it land.

References

Census-designated places in Snohomish County, Washington